Mizhi County is a county of Yulin, Shaanxi, China. Mizhi is situated in the Loess Plateau on the banks of Wuding River.

The county is established in 1226, named after Mizhizhai (Mizhi Stockade). It was renamed Tianbao in about 1643 by Li Zicheng, but was restored as Mizhi soon. Also, Li built his temporary palace in the county. During the second Sino-Japanese war, it was administered by the Shaanxi-Gansu-Ningxia Border Region government.

Administrative divisions
As 2019, Mizhi County is divided to 1 subdistricts and 7 towns.
Subdistricts
 Yinzhou Subdistrict

Towns

Climate

Transportation
China National Highway 210

Notes and references

References

County-level divisions of Shaanxi
Yulin, Shaanxi